The Heathland School is an 11–18 co-educational community comprehensive school located in the London Borough of Hounslow. As a comprehensive school, Heathland School provides a broad general education for girls and boys.

Curriculum 
It has a traditional curriculum based on academic subjects, taught by well qualified staff. Pupils are placed in teaching sets from Year 7 for core subjects according to their ability in each subject with the exception of art, drama, information and communications technology (taught in sets according to tutor group), music, physical education and religious education. Pupils are taught in their tutor groups in these subjects.

Homework is an integral part of pupils' learning and pupils in all years receive regular, set homework. All pupils study religious education to GCSE standard as either short or full courses and the great majority of pupils study ten subjects at GCSE.

The sixth form is the largest in Hounslow, enabling it to offer a wide range of AS and GCSE advanced courses in addition to vocational courses at both intermediate and advanced level. Approximately 90% of the upper sixth students take up places at University.

The 2013 inspection report by Ofsted graded the school "outstanding" in all criteria. Since then is has been degraded to "good". The new headmaster (of 02/22 - Mr Rose) is temporary headmaster since the last (Mrs S Huxley) quit to "spend time with family", Mr Pattar OBE has also returned for a part time job as acting deputy headmaster.

References

External links
 The Heathland School - official web site

Secondary schools in the London Borough of Hounslow
Community schools in the London Borough of Hounslow